Storkhead box 1 is a protein in humans that is encoded by the STOX1 gene.

The protein encoded by this gene may function as a DNA binding protein. Mutations in this gene are associated with pre-eclampsia/eclampsia 4 (PEE4). Alternatively spliced transcript variants encoding different isoforms have been found for this gene. [provided by RefSeq, Sep 2009].

References

Further reading 

Human proteins